Gardner Cox House is a historic home located at Hannawa Falls in St. Lawrence County, New York.  It was built in 1838 and is a two-story, late Federal style stone structure, with a single-story wood-framed ell.

It was listed on the National Register of Historic Places in 1986.

References

Houses on the National Register of Historic Places in New York (state)
Federal architecture in New York (state)
Houses completed in 1838
Houses in St. Lawrence County, New York
National Register of Historic Places in St. Lawrence County, New York